Islam Abou Salima (born 25 June 1993 "or" 1 January 1993) is an Egyptian footballer who plays as a center-back for Al Masry.

References

1993 births
Egyptian footballers
Living people
Egyptian Premier League players
Association football defenders
Al Masry SC players
El Sharkia SC players
People from Damietta